Her First Affaire is a 1932 British drama film directed by Allan Dwan and starring Ida Lupino, George Curzon and Diana Napier. It was based on a 1930 play of the same title by Merrill Rogers and Frederick J. Jackson. It was shot at Teddington Studios, with sets designed by the art director J. Elder Wills.

Plot
A headstrong young girl falls completely for a writer of trashy novels, and insinuates herself into his household, all to the chagrin of her erstwhile fiancé. He conspires with the author's wife to show the girl how foolish she's been.

Cast
 Ida Lupino as Anne
 George Curzon as Carey Merton
 Diana Napier as Mrs Merton
 Harry Tate as Major Gore
 Muriel Aked as Agatha Brent
 Arnold Riches as Brian
 Kenneth Kove as Professor Hotspur
 Helen Haye as Lady Bragden
 Roland Culver as Drunk
 Melville Gideon as Melville Gideon

References

Bibliography
 Goble, Alan. The Complete Index to Literary Sources in Film. Walter de Gruyter, 1999.

External links

1932 films
1932 drama films
Films directed by Allan Dwan
British drama films
Films shot at Teddington Studios
British black-and-white films
Films based on works by American writers
1930s English-language films
1930s British films